Elgamal may refer to:

ElGamal encryption, an asymmetric key encryption algorithm for public-key cryptography
ElGamal signature scheme, a digital signature scheme
Taher Elgamal (born 1955), Egyptian cryptographer